IRAS 20324+4057 is a mixture of interstellar gas and dust that extends a light year in length in the Cygnus constellation, 4,600 light-years away. It is located within the Cygnus OB2 association. It has been imaged by the Hubble Space Telescope and has been nicknamed a "Cosmic Caterpillar", as it resembles a crawling caterpillar. The head of the object is a protostar, but the presence of 65 O-type stars, which tend to scatter the matter accumulated by the Cosmic caterpillar, leaves doubt whether the caterpillar will survive and mature into a star.

References

Cosmic dust
Planetary science
Cygnus (constellation)
Hubble Space Telescope images
IRAS catalogue objects